Łukasz Kubot was the defender of title, however he chose to not take part in this tournament.
Robin Vik became the new champion, after beating Jan Minář in the final 6–1, 6–2.

Seeds

Draw

Final four

Top half

Bottom half

References
 Main Draw
 Qualifying Draw

Oberstaufen Cup - Singles
Oberstaufen Cup